Dr. Doris Marie Brougham (born 1926) is an American educator and Christian missionary. Studio Classroom, the English teaching program Brougham founded in 1962, has taught English to hundreds of thousands of people in Asia. Brougham also founded Heavenly Melody, the first Chinese Christian choir composing original music, and Overseas Radio & Television, Inc., a media company.

Born in Seattle on 5 August 1926, Brougham made up her mind at age 12 she wanted to share God’s love with the Chinese people. In 1948, after graduating from the University of Washington with a B.A. in Far East Studies, she traveled to China via ship. After witnessing the Chinese Civil War, Brougham moved to Hong Kong in 1949, then to Taiwan in 1951.

Brougham worked with the Atayal tribe in Hualien, eastern Taiwan. Shortly after, she started the first Christian radio broadcast in Taiwan. Believing media is the most effective medium to influence people, she founded Overseas Radio & Television, Inc. in 1960. She saw a great need for English on the island, so in 1962, she founded Studio Classroom, an English teaching radio program. The program was extremely popular, and later expanded into three English teaching programs with accompanying magazines- Studio Classroom, Let’s Talk in English, and Advanced.

Besides English, Brougham, a life-long musician and avid trumpet player, produced Taiwan’s first Christian TV program, Heaven Melody, which aired in 1963. The show’s choir became the Heavenly Melody Singers, a professional choir that has held concerts in 36 countries and continue to share their music globally.

A life-long educator, Brougham has received numerous awards, including the Order of the Brilliant Star, Taiwan’s highest non-military honor in 2002, for her contributions to the development of Taiwan. She was one of the first foreigners to receive Permanent Resident status on the island. Brougham’s hometown, Seattle, declared 2 April 2014 Doris Brougham Day in recognition of her exemplary work.

Awards

Awarded Outstanding Women Award by the National Women’s League of the R.O.C. (2021)
Awarded Honorary Citizen by Tainan City Government (2017)    
The city of Seattle in the U.S. state of Washington declared 2 April as Doris Brougham Day (2014)
The Washington State Senate passed a senate resolution to honor Doris M. Brougham for her lifelong dedication to Taiwan 
and enhancement of good bilateral relations between Washington 
State and Taiwan (2014) 
Recipient of the NRB International Individual Achievement Award (2011)   
Recipient of the NRB Prestigious Milestone Award (2011)     
Lifetime Achievement Award, Asian Publishing Awards (2010)
Love of Lives Literary Composition Award from the Chou, Ta-Kuan Foundation (2010)  
Hualien County Honorable Citizen Award (2008)       
Recipient Schweitzer Award for English Teaching from the King Car Education Foundation (2004)  
Recipient of the Order of the Brilliant Star with Violet Grand Cordon awarded by Taiwan’s President Chen Shui-bian (2002)
Recipient of the Individual Achievement in International Broadcasting, International 
Information Ministry Award by the National Religious Broadcasters (NRB) (2001)  
Outstanding Performance by a Foreign Missionary from ROC’s Ministry of Interior (1997)
Honorable Citizen Award from the Mayor of Taipei (1996)
Golden Tripod Award for Outstanding Contribution to Education in the R.O.C. (1989)     
Integrity and Excellence in Broadcasting Award (Washington, DC) (1988)    
Produced, Good Morning Today English teaching television series
National Religious Broadcasters (NRB) International Award, USA (1986)
R.O.C. Special Teacher’s Award (Confucius Award) (1984)
R.O.C. Good People—Good Deeds Award (1982)
Hosted Wonderful Street English teaching television series (1980)
Hosted Around the World in English teaching television series (1977)
Golden Bell Award in Educational Radio Programs (1969)
Co-produced Heavenly Melody weekly telecast (1963–75)
Co-founder of Overseas Radio & Television Inc. (1960)

Education
Doctor of Christian Ministries (Honorary), Belhaven College, Jackson, Mississippi (2009)
Doctor of Humane Letters (L.H.D.) Seattle Pacific University, Seattle, (1991)
Doctor of Human Letters (L.H.D.) Azusa Pacific University, Los Angeles (1988)
Doctor of Laws (L.L.D.) Pacific States University, Los Angeles (1986)
M.A. Communications, Pacific Western University, Los Angeles, (1986) 
A 1953 alumna of Seattle Pacific College
B.A. in Far East Studies, University of Washington, Seattle, Washington (1947–48)
Simpson Bible College, Seattle, Washington, USA, BA in Christian Education

References

External links
Doris Brougham profile via Studio Classroom
Doris Brougham profile via ORTV
The China Post 2021/4/9 Doris M. Brougham praises Taiwan's transformation for the better

American Protestant missionaries
1926 births
University of Washington College of Arts and Sciences alumni
Living people
Taiwanese Protestants
Female Christian missionaries
Educators from Seattle
American women educators
Taiwanese educators
Protestant missionaries in Taiwan
American emigrants to Taiwan
Recipients of the Order of Brilliant Star
Missionary educators